World Class Championship Wrestling (WCCW), based out of Dallas, Texas held a number of major professional wrestling super shows under the name Wrestling Star Wars between 1981 and 1989, with three of these being held in 1982. Promoter Fritz Von Erich held two "Wrestling Star Wars" events, one in March and one in August as well as a special "Christmas Star Wars" on December 25 of that year. The driving storyline behind both the second and third Star Wars show of 1982 was Von Erich's son Kerry Von Erich's quest to defeat Ric Flair for the NWA World Heavyweight Championship, a quest that was ultimately unsuccessful due to the Fabulous Freebirds turning on the Von Erich family, starting the most well known storyline in WCCW as the Von Erichs and the Freebirds fought for years following the December Christmas Star Wars.

Wrestling Star Wars (March)

Wrestling Star Wars (March 1982) was a professional wrestling supercard show that was held on March 15, 1982 The show was produced and scripted by the Dallas, Texas based World Class Championship Wrestling (WCCW) professional wrestling promotion and held in their home area, Dallas/Ft. Worth, Texas. Several matches from the show were taped for WCCW's television shows and broadcast in the weeks following the show. The show was the fourth overall show in the "Wrestling Star Wars" event chronology. The show was held at the Fort Worth Convention Center.

Results

Wrestling Star Wars (August)

Wrestling Star Wars (August 1982) was a professional wrestling supercard show that was held on August 15, 1982. The show was produced and scripted by the Dallas, Texas based World Class Championship Wrestling (WCCW) professional wrestling promotion and held in their home area, Dallas/Ft. Worth, Texas. Several matches from the show were taped for WCCW's television shows and broadcast in the weeks following the show. The show was the fifth overall show in the "Wrestling Star Wars" event chronology. The show, held at the Fort Worth Convention Center, drew 18,000 spectators, the maximum capacity of the Conventions center when configured for wrestling shows.

The main event of the show was National Wrestling Alliance (NWA) World Heavyweight Champion Ric Flair defending the championship against Kerry Von Erich in a "Best two-out-of-three" falls match. Flair won the first fall on a DQ after Kerry accidentally hit special appointed NWA referee Alfred Neely with a discus punch, while Von Erich won the second fall by pinfall with the Iron Claw. In the third and final fall Ric Flair and Kerry Von Erich battled to a Double Disqualification.

Results

Christmas Star Wars

World Class Championship Wrestling (WCCW) held their second annual Christmas Star Wars, a major professional wrestling show held on December 25 each year from 1981 through 1987. Some of the matches on the show were taped and later shown on television as part of WCCW's weekly shows. The focal point of the show was promoter Fritz Von Erich's son Kerry Von Erich challenging Ric Flair for the NWA World Heavyweight Championship in the main event. The fifth and the eight match of the night were both shown on WCCW television programs on December 27, 1982 and the main event match between Von Erich and Flair was the focus of the WCCW television show on December 28, 1982. These episodes were later made available as part of the WWE Network. One of the undercard matches was a six-man tag team match to determine the first ever holders of the WCCW Six-Man Tag Team Championship as the team of the Fabulous Freebirds (Michael Hayes, Terry Gordy and Buddy Roberts) were slated to take on the team of Tom Steele Mike and Ben Sharpe representing Canada in the tournament. Prior to the match Michael Hayes announced that due to bad winter weather Buddy Roberts was not in the building. Following that announcement David Von Erich came to the ring and offered to team with the Freebirds. Von Erich and the Freebirds won the match and the championship, after which Von Erich relinquished his part of the championship to Buddy Roberts. The final match of the show was actually shown on TV before WCCW showed the match between Ric Flair and Kerry Von Erich, allowing them to dedicate the entire December 28 episode to the match between Ric Flair and Kerry Von Erich. At the August Wrestling Star Wars Ric Flair had managed to escape the match against Kerry Von Erich with the championship still in his possession. Following that show the storyline was that Ric Flair had offered a bounty to anyone who could injure Kerry Von Erich. The Great Kabuki collected the bounty as he hurt Von Erich's knee, giving them a storyline reason to cover for Von Erich's legitimate knee surgery. The Championship rematch was made into a Steel Cage Match and Fritz Von Erich decided to add a special guest referee to ensure everything was handled fairly. WCCW held a write in vote to determine the referee with the fans choosing Fabulous Freebird member Michael Hayes for the job alongside regular referee David Manning. After the introductions Terry Gordy came to ring side to hold the key that locked the steel cage door, to ensure that no one could get in and attack Von Erich who was a close friend of the Freebirds. During the match Von Erich applied the Iron Claw to Flair and held it for several minutes. During the hold Hayes thought that Flair had his foot under the bottom rope, a call that David Manning disagreed with, but Hayes made Von Erich break the claw hold anyway. Once he realized what he had done Hayes appeared to be upset and struck Ric Flair, knocking him down. When Hayes urged Von Erich to pin Flair Von Erich refused, which upset Hayes greatly. This led to Hayes leaving the cage while Von Erich tried to stop him. Moments later Terry Gordy slammed the door shut on Kerry Von Erich, striking him in the face and cementing that the Freebirds had just turned on their long time friend. Hayes returned moments later and counted Von Erich's shoulders down even though he clearly kicked out at 2. Subsequently David Manning ejected the Freebirds and announced that the match was not over. Minutes later Manning had no choice but to call for the bell as a bloodied Kerry Von Erich was unable to continue. The circumstances around the match was the start of the storyline feud between the Freebirds and the Von Erich family that would last for several years and has been the focal point of several DVD features such as "Heroes of World Class Wrestling: the Story of the Von Erichs" in 2007 and "The Triumph and Tragedy of World Class Championship Wrestling" released in 2011.

Battle Royal order of elimination

References

1982 in professional wrestling
World Class Championship Wrestling shows
1982 in Texas
Events in Dallas
Professional wrestling in the Dallas–Fort Worth metroplex
March 1982 events in the United States
August 1982 events in the United States
December 1982 events in the United States